The Nehru-Kotelawala Pact was an agreement that was signed between Jawaharlal Nehru, the Prime Minister of India, and John Kotelawala, the Prime Minister of Sri Lanka, on 18 January 1954. It was an agreement in regarding to the status and future of people of Indian origin in Ceylon. They were brought by British from Madras Presidency in British India to work in tea, coffee and coconut plantations of British Ceylon.

In the pact, India accepted in principle the repatriation of Indian population in Ceylon. But Jawaharlal Nehru only supported voluntary repatriation of those who  voluntary accepted Indian citizenship. India disagreed on Sri Lankan position that suggested granting Indian citizenship to people, who failed to qualify for Sri Lankan citizenship.

See also 
 Ceylon Citizenship Act, 1948
 Bandaranaike–Chelvanayakam Pact, 1957
 Sirima-Shastri Pact, 1964
 Sirima-Gandhi Pact, 1974

References

Further reading 
 
 

Politics of Sri Lanka
History of Sri Lanka (1948–present)
India–Sri Lanka relations
Indian Tamils of Sri Lanka